The 2016 Colorado State Rams football team represented Colorado State University during the 2016 NCAA Division I FBS football season. The Rams were led by second-year head coach Mike Bobo and played their home games at Sonny Lubick Field at Hughes Stadium. It was their last season before moving to a new stadium in 2017. They were a member of the Mountain Division of the Mountain West Conference. They finished the season 7–6, 5–3 in Mountain West play to finish in a tie for fourth place in the Mountain Division. They were invited to the Famous Idaho Potato Bowl where they lost to Idaho.

Schedule

Schedule Source:

Roster

Game summaries

vs. Colorado

UTSA

Northern Colorado

at Minnesota

Wyoming

Utah State

at Boise State

at UNLV

Fresno State

at Air Force

New Mexico

 This was the Rams' final home game at Hughes Stadium.

at San Diego State

vs. Idaho–Famous Idaho Potato Bowl

References

Colorado State
Colorado State Rams football seasons
Colorado State Rams football